The Center for Education Policy Analysis (CEPA) is a research center at the Stanford Graduate School of Education dedicated to action-oriented research on education policies. CEPA's research focuses on the impact of poverty and inequality on educational achievement, the evaluation of federal and state education policy, teaching and leadership effectiveness, and technological innovations in education. CEPA was established in 2009 as part of the Stanford Challenge, a multidisciplinary initiative at Stanford University aimed at improving K-12 education. It is ranked as the 10th most influential education policy think tank worldwide by the Think Tanks and Civil Societies Program.

Activities

The main focus of CEPA's activities is on performing research on education policies in the United States. These research activities are mediated through a series of research projects, including:
 Stanford Education Data Archive
 Early Childhood Education and Care
 CEPA Labs
 Educational Opportunity Monitoring Project
 Teaching & Learning in Online College Courses
 Changing Ecology of Higher Education
 Getting Down to Facts
 Quality Teacher and Education Act in San Francisco (QTEA)
 School Leadership Research
 Stereotype Threat and Achievement Gaps in Middle School
 Teacher Policy Research

The outcomes of these research projects are published by CEPA in the form of reports, working papers, journal articles, and books.
Additionally, CEPA also offers training programmes for doctorate candidates, postdoctoral fellowships and research assistantships for undergraduates.

Steering Committee 

 Thomas Dee
 Susanna Loeb
 Michelle Reininger
 Eric Bettinger
 Sean Reardon
 Jelena Obradovic
 Benjamin Domingue

Faculty 

 Martin Carnoy
 Geoffrey L. Cohen
 Thomas Ehrlich
 Eric Hanushek
 Ed Haertel
 Caroline Hoxby
 Michael W. Kirst
 William Koski
 Prashant Loyalka
 David Plank
 Rob Reich
 Mitchell L. Stevens
 Deborah Stipek

References

External links

 Website of CEPA

Research institutes established in 2009
Research institutes in California
2009 establishments in California
Stanford University
Educational research